Grand Designs New Zealand is a New Zealand television series. It is based on the British television series Grand Designs and it was originally presented by the architect Chris Moller and aired on TV3. Following Moller's departure after the 6th season, it was confirmed that architect Tom Webster will take over from the 7th season in 2022, which would air on TVNZ 1. It began airing in New Zealand on 4 October 2015.

Format 
The series' presenter follows the progress of interesting and ambitious house building projects, speaking with the owners and tracking the ups and downs of the design, construction and moving in.

Series overview

Episodes

Season 1 (2015)

Season 2 (2016)

Season 3 (2017)

Season 4 (2018)

Season 5 (2019)

Season 6 (2020)

Season 7 (2022)

References

External links

2015 New Zealand television series debuts
2010s New Zealand television series
2020s New Zealand television series
Architecture in New Zealand
Three (TV channel) original programming
Documentary television series about architecture